QLT Consumer Lease Services, formerly AT&T Consumer Lease Services, is a New Jersey-based telephone equipment leasing company. The company provides telephone leasing services to residences and small businesses in the United States. These services include next business day replacement of the leased product for any reason.  

QLT CLS leases the following models made by Western Electric:
 Traditional 500/554 Rotary Phone
 Traditional 2500/2554 Touch-Tone Telephone
 Trimline 220/222 Rotary Desk/Wall phone
 Trimline 2220/2222 Touch-Tone Desk/Wall phone

QLT CLS also leases the following models released post-breakup, manufactured by AT&T Technologies, Lucent Technologies, or Advanced American Telephones:
 Signature Traditional Desk/Wall Model
 Signature Trimline
 Signature Princess

QLT Consumer Lease Services also leases cordless phones, feature phones, answering machines & telephone accessories. 

Customers of Consumer Phone Services, in 2019, number less than a hundred thousand. In 2007, some 580,000 customers still leased phones through the company. A majority of the customers are elderly who have found convenience in simply leasing the same telephone. Most customers are also leftovers from before the 1984 breakup of AT&T, who did not opt to purchase their telephones before the buyout option expired in 1987. One criticism in these cases has been that such customers have paid over ten times the value of the leased phone over the course of many years. Customers do retain the benefit of free replacement if the phone ever breaks and free accessories such as long cords.

On October 1, 2008, AT&T Consumer Lease Services changed its name to QLT Consumer Lease Services.

As of 2009, Kathy Matlesky is president of the company.

References

External links 
 QLT Consumer Lease Services

Alcatel-Lucent
AT&T subsidiaries
Companies based in New Jersey